This is a list of Canadian television related events from 1987.

Events

Debuts

Ending this year

Births 
 April 1 - Mackenzie Davis, actress
 April 27 - Emma Taylor-Isherwood, actress
 June 14 - Jordan Hayes, actress
 October 15 - Chantal Strand, actress, voice actress, writer and singer

Television shows

1950s
Country Canada (1954–2007)
Hockey Night in Canada (1952–present)
The National (1954–present)
Front Page Challenge (1957–1995)
Wayne and Shuster Show (1958–1989)

1960s
CTV National News (1961–present)
Land and Sea (1964–present)
Man Alive (1967–2000)
Mr. Dressup (1967–1996)
The Nature of Things (1960–present, scientific documentary series)
Question Period (1967–present, news program)
The Tommy Hunter Show (1965–1992)
W-FIVE (1966–present, newsmagazine program)

1970s
The Beachcombers (1972–1990)
Canada AM (1972–present, news program)
City Lights (1973–1989)
Definition (1974–1989)
the fifth estate (1975–present, newsmagazine program)
Live It Up! (1978–1990)
Marketplace (1972–present, newsmagazine program)
You Can't Do That on Television (1979–1990)
100 Huntley Street (1977–present, religious program)

1980s
Adderly (1986–1988)
Airwaves (1986–1990)
Bumper Stumpers (1987–1990)
The Campbells (1986–1990)
Check it Out! (1985–1988)
The Comedy Mill (1986–1991)
Danger Bay (1984–1990)
The Journal (1982–1992)
Midday (1985–2000)
Night Heat (1985–1989)
The Raccoons (1985–1992)
Switchback (1981–1990)
Under the Umbrella Tree (1986–1993)
Venture (1985–2007)
Video Hits (1984–1993)

TV movies and miniseries
Anne of Avonlea
Heaven on Earth
Race for the Bomb

Television stations

Debuts

References

See also
 1987 in Canada
 List of Canadian films of 1987